Karneh may refer to:
Karneh, Ardabil
Karneh, Zanjan